Misgav Am (lit. Fortress of the People) is a kibbutz in the Upper Galilee in northern Israel. Located close to the border with Lebanon, facing the Lebanese town of Odaisseh, and near the Israeli town of Kiryat Shmona, it falls under the jurisdiction of Upper Galilee Regional Council.

Misgav Am is 840 m (2,760 feet) above sea level and overlooks on one side the Hula Valley and on the other side the neighboring Lebanese village of Odaisseh.

History
The kibbutz was founded on 2 November 1945, the anniversary of the Balfour Declaration, by young Palmach members. It was located at the northern part of the now depopulated Palestinian village of Hunin.

New immigrants from Europe, the United States and South America began to settle there in the late 1970s.

On 7 April 1980, five terrorists from the Iraqi-backed Arab Liberation Front penetrated Misgav Am in the night and entered the nursery. They killed the kibbutz secretary and an infant boy and held the rest of the children hostage, demanding the release of about 50 terrorists held in Israeli prisons. The first raid of an IDF infantry unit was unsuccessful, but a second attempt, a few hours later, succeeded, and all the terrorists were killed. Two kibbutz members and one soldier were killed, four children and 11 soldiers were wounded.

Immediately after the attack, Israeli troops entered southern Lebanon to wipe out terrorist nests and to intensify the pressure on the Palestinian terrorists in Lebanon. Israel withdrew after five days, because of heavy political pressure by the United States. In the years of Israeli presence in southern Lebanon (1982–2000), the kibbutz had cordial relations with the people on the other side of the border, despite the state of war between Lebanon and Israel since 1948.

During the Second Lebanon war in 2006, several thousands of IDF troops were deployed around Misgav Am, which brought heavy logistical problems regarding food, water and sanitary facilities.

Education
The kibbutz offers an education system beginning age three and ending after high school. There is a daycare center for babies, another for infants and also a kindergarten. Elementary school is at kibbutz Kfar Giladi. Junior and senior high school is located at kibbutz Dafna.

With the new policy of a longer schooling day, children receive various enrichment classes in the region: dance and music at Kfar Blum, ice-skating at Canada centre of Metula, and karate at Ramot Naftali.

Kibbutz life
Around 90 of the 300 people living in Misgav Am are members. Many residents study in the nearby Academic College of Tel Hai. The kibbutz residents celebrate some of the Jewish and national holidays together, which is kind of a kibbutz tradition: Lag Ba'omer, Independence Day, Hanukkah, Tu Bishvat and Shavuot.

The kibbutz has a covered swimming pool, a library, a mini-market and sports courts. Besides a 24-hour Magen David Adom emergency station, there is also a health clinic which belongs to Clalit Health Services.

Economy
The kibbutz factory, Sion Texo Medic Ltd., produces bandages and wound dressings.

References

External links
 Official website
 Educational tours and visitors center (official website)

Kibbutzim
Populated places established in 1945
Populated places in Northern District (Israel)
1945 establishments in Mandatory Palestine